Cairn Catto is a Neolithic long cairn near the village of Longside, Aberdeenshire, Scotland. Historic Environment Scotland established the site as a scheduled monument in 1973.

Description
Cairn Catto is located southeast of Longside, in Aberdeenshire, Scotland. The site is four miles north-west of Cruden Bay, to the west of the minor road between the A952 and the A950.

The existing monument measures . It consists of several mounds of pink-granite stones of great length. The southwest end of the cairn has been robbed. Several holes have been discovered on the southeastern edge of the cairn. The Arbuthnot Museum in Peterhead houses two stone axes that were found at Cairn Catto in 1885. Historic Environment Scotland established the site as a scheduled monument in 1973.

See also
 Longman Hill
 Morris Wells
 Skelmuir Hill

References

Archaeological sites in Aberdeenshire
Tumuli in Scotland
Scheduled monuments in Scotland